Gemmobacter aquaticus is a Gram-negative, rod-shaped, non-spore-forming and motile bacterium from the genus of Gemmobacter with a single polar flagellum which has been isolated from  water from the Daqing reservoir in China.

References

External links
Type strain of Gemmobacter aquaticus at BacDive -  the Bacterial Diversity Metadatabase

Rhodobacteraceae
Bacteria described in 2010